FK Pobeda Valandovo is a football club from Valandovo, North Macedonia. They currently play in the Macedonian Third League.

History
The club was founded in 1948. The club has made the greatest achievement when was won the Macedonian Second League (Eastern group) in the 1994–95 season and was initially promoted to the Macedonian First League, but was expelled due to unknown reasons.

Honours

 Macedonian Second League:
Winners (1): 1994–95

References

External links
Club info at MacedonianFootball 
Football Federation of Macedonia 

Football clubs in North Macedonia
1948 establishments in the Socialist Republic of Macedonia
FK